Bühlmann is a surname. Notable people with the surname include:

Albert A. Bühlmann (1923–1994), Swiss physician at the Laboratory of Hyperbaric Physiology at the University Hospital, Zürich, Switzerland
Claudia Bühlmann, Swiss bobsledder who competed in the mid-1990s
Gabriele Bühlmann (born 1964), Swiss rifle shooter who competed at five Olympic Games from 1988 to 2004
Paul Bühlmann (1927–2000), Swiss actor
Peter Bühlmann (born 1965), Swiss mathematician and statistician

See also
Bühlmann decompression algorithm, mathematical model of the way that inert gases enter and leave the body as pressure changes
Bühlmann model, random effects model used in credibility theory in actuarial science to determine the insurance premiums